Huanglong Cave is a karst cave located in Wulingyuan District, Zhangjiajie City, Hunan, People's Republic of China and a national 4A rated scenic area. As of 2010, the cave has over a million visitors per year. Since 1997, the Huanglong Cave scenic area has been managed by Beijing-based China Datong Co. Ltd. It was previously managed directly by the Hunan provincial government.

In addition to the cave itself the Huanglong Cave scenic area includes Huanglong Cave Ecology Square, completed in 2009 by restoring the landscape of the area adjacent to the cave entrance. In 2010, the Zhangjiajie government ordered the construction of the "Hallelujah Concert Hall" as the centerpiece to the Ecology Square, not far from the cave entrance. The hall has a grass-planted roof and cost 160 million Chinese yuan.

Features
There are four levels, thirteen chambers, three underground waterfalls, two underground rivers, three pools, ninety-six passages, as well as an underground lake. The guided tour through the cave lasts about two hours and includes a boat ride down one of the underground rivers.

See also
List of caves in China

References

External links
(In Chinese) Huanglong Cave website (黄龙洞网站)
(In Chinese) Zhangjiajie City Government website - Huanlong Cave (黄龙洞)

Caves of Hunan
Karst caves
Karst formations of China
Show caves in China
Tourist attractions in Hunan